In military terms, 118th Division or 118th Infantry Division may refer to:

 118th Division (People's Republic of China)
 118th Jäger Division (Wehrmacht)
 118th Division (Imperial Japanese Army)
 118th Guards Rifle Division (Soviet Union)